Los Bastos Formation is a geologic formation of the Neuquén Basin in the northern Patagonian provinces of Mendoza and Neuquén. The formation dates to the Late Cretaceous, early to middle Coniacian, and belongs to the Río Neuquén Subgroup of the Neuquén Group. The formation overlies the Portezuelo Formation, in which it was formerly included and is overlain by the Sierra Barrosa Formation. Los Bastos Formation comprises mudstones and sandstones deposited in a fluvial environment. The dinosaur Malarguesaurus florenciae and a meridiolestid mammal were recovered from the formation.

Description 
The formation was named by Garrido in 2010 as shaly unit conformably and transitionally overlying the Portezuelo Formation, to which the layers were formerly defined and in the same manner underlying the Sierra Barrosa Formation, all belonging to the Río Neuquén Subgroup of the Neuquén Group in the Neuquén Basin. The unit now known as Los Bastos Formation was included in the original definition by Herrero Ducloux (1938, 1939) as "Portezuelo Medio", as part of the "Portezuelo Beds" he described.

The type locality of the formation is located at the foot of the outcrop of the eponymous Los Bastos Field, between the localities of Sierra Barrosa and Cerro Senillosa. The formation comprises red mudstones intercalated by thin levels of siltstones and fine well-sorted yellowish to greenish grey sandstones. The formation has similar lithological characteristics as the Lisandro Formation and was deposited in a fluvial environment characterized by sinuous channels. Based on the stratigraphic relations with the overlying and underlying units, the age has been estimated to be early to middle Coniacian.

Fossil content 
The formation has provided fossils of:
 Mammals
 Meridiolestida indet.

See also 
 List of dinosaur bearing rock formations

References

Bibliography 

 
 

Geologic formations of Argentina
Neuquén Group
Upper Cretaceous Series of South America
Cretaceous Argentina
Coniacian Stage
Mudstone formations
Sandstone formations
Fluvial deposits
Fossiliferous stratigraphic units of South America
Paleontology in Argentina
Geology of Mendoza Province
Geology of Neuquén Province
Geology of Patagonia